Katasophistes is a Neotropical genus of water scavenger beetle in the family Hydrophilidae represented by four described species known from the Guiana Shield Region.

Taxonomy 
The genus Katasophistes was described for the first time by Girón & Short in 2018.

It belongs in the subfamily Acidocerinae and contains four described species from Ecuador, Peru, and Venezuela.

Description 
Small beetles (2.7–4.5 mm), smooth and shiny dorsally, brown to dark brown in coloration, with long maxillary palps. A complete diagnosis was presented by Girón and Short.

Habitat 
According to Girón and Short species known from Ecuador and Peru have been collected from forested stream pools with abundant detritus, whereas Katasophistes merida from Venezuela has been collected on seepages.

Species 

 Katasophistes charynae Girón and Short, 2018
 Katasophistes cuzco Girón and Short, 2018
 Katasophistes merida Girón and Short, 2018
 Katasophistes superficialis Girón and Short, 2018

References 

Hydrophilidae
Insects of South America
Insects described in 2018